Albert Bowler (born 1891) was an English professional footballer who played as an inside forward.

Career
Bowler was born in Nottingham. He began his career while serving as a private in the British Army, playing for Army Cup winners Sherwood Foresters. He obtained his discharge from the Army in 1911, allowing him to join Southern League club Plymouth Argyle. He made his first team debut in a 1–0 win at New Brompton on 23 December 1911 and scored his first goal against Millwall in a 2–0 win on 6 January 1912. The following season, Bowler scored 18 league goals in 36 appearances as the club became Southern League champions. He played in five matches for the Southern League representative side and was selected for England in an unofficial international against Scotland in Cairo during the First World War. He returned to Plymouth after the war, and was a member of the squad when the club was elected to the Football League in 1920. Bowler continued playing for another three years before retiring from the game in 1923.

Personal life
Bowler enlisted in the British Army in January 1908, but was discharged by purchase three years later. During the First World War, he returned to the army, serving in the Sherwood Foresters as a private.

Honours
Plymouth Argyle
Southern Football League: 1912–13

References

External links
Bertie Bowler at Greens on Screen

English footballers
Plymouth Argyle F.C. players
Southern Football League players
English Football League players
1891 births
British Army personnel of World War I
Sherwood Foresters soldiers
Southern Football League representative players
Association football inside forwards
Date of death missing
People from Southwell, Nottinghamshire
Footballers from Nottinghamshire
Military personnel from Nottingham